SóNós is the second solo album by Kid Abelha lead singer Paula Toller, released by Warner Music Brasil on June 28, 2007.

Track listing
 "? (O Q é Q Eu Sou)" (Erasmo Carlos) – 3:12
 "All Over" (Donavon Frankenreiter, Paul Ralphes, Caio Fonseca, Toller) – 3:22
 "À Noite Sonhei Contigo" (Kevin Johansen / Portuguese version: Toller) – 3:52
 "Pane de Maravilha" (Dado Villa-Lobos, Toller, Fausto Fawcet) / Incidental song: "Cidade Maravilhosa" (André Filho) – 3:28
 "If You Won't" (Jesse Harris) – 2:21
 "Meu Amor Se Mudou pra Lua" (Nenung) – 3:19
 "Tudo Se Perdeu" (Rufus Wainwright¹ / Portuguese version: Toller) – 2:43
 "Long Way from Home" (Harris) – 2:09
 "Barcelona 16" (Toller, Ralphes, Fonseca) – 3:59
 "Eu Quero Ir Pra Rua" (Coringa, Toller) – 3:50
 "Um Primeiro Beijo" (Toller, Ralphes, Fonseca) – 2:54
 "Vc me Ganhou de Presente" (Ralphes, Coringa, Toller) – 3:50
 "Rústica" (Villa-Lobos, Toller) – 3:10
 "Glass (I'm So Brazilian)" (Johansen) – 3:58

¹original title: Vicious World.

References

External links
Toller's official website

2007 albums
Kid Abelha albums